Suhail Nayyar is an Indian actor. Born in New Delhi, he studied film and acting at the Film and Television Institute of India (FTII, Pune) before moving to Mumbai to start his career in acting. After doing Theatre and several advertisements, he was cast in his first feature film project with Phantom Films, Udta Punjab.

Nayyar is also a part of the popular web series, Life Sahi Hai, and co-starred in Hotel Mumbai, a 2018 American-Australian thriller film based on the 26/11 Mumbai attacks, directed by Anthony Maras.His recent project was with Rishi Kapoor,the film Sharmaji Namkeen in which he played the role of son of the protagonist.

Filmography

Films

Web series

References

External links
 

Indian male film actors
Male actors in Hindi cinema
Living people
1989 births
Male actors from New Delhi
People from Delhi